In Ireland and Scotland a broken man were clansmen who no longer had any allegiance to their original clan. It may also refer to:

The Broken Man (2016), the seventh episode of the sixth season the television series Game of Thrones
The Hymn of a Broken Man (2011),  the debut album by Times of Grace
Memoirs of a Broken Man (2009), debut album by Futures End
"Broken Man", song by Status Quo from On the Level (1975)
"Broken Man", song by Boys Like Girls from their self-titled debut album (2006)

See also
The Broken Men (1902), by Rudyard Kipling